Jarrett, Jarratt, Jarrott or Jarret may refer to:

People
Jarrett (name), a page for people with the name "Jarrett"

Places

United States
 Jarratt, Virginia
 Jarrett, West Virginia
 Jarrettsville, Maryland

France
 Jarret, Hautes-Pyrénées, commune

Other
 Jarrett (film), a 1973 TV movie
 USS Jarrett (FFG-33), a U.S. guided-missile frigate
 Jarrett Tibbs, a character in Cyberbully (2011 film)

See also
 Planet Jarrett, a professional wrestling stable